JOVE (Jonathan's Own Version of Emacs) is an open-source, Emacs-like text editor, primarily intended for Unix-like operating systems. It also supports MS-DOS and Microsoft Windows. JOVE was inspired by Gosling Emacs but is much smaller and simpler, lacking Mocklisp. It was originally created in 1983 by Jonathan Payne while at Lincoln-Sudbury Regional High School in Massachusetts, United States on a PDP-11 minicomputer.
JOVE was distributed with several releases of BSD Unix, including 2.9BSD, 4.3BSD-Reno and 4.4BSD-Lite2.

As of 2022, the latest development release of JOVE is version 4.17.4.4; the stable version is 4.16.  Unlike GNU Emacs, JOVE does not support UTF-8.

See also 

 List of text editors
 Comparison of text editors

External links
GitHub repository
JOVE Development FTP site
FSF Free Software Directory entry

References

Unix text editors
Free text editors
Emacs
DOS text editors
Software using the GPL license